Lou Serrone is a former American football coach.  He was the head football coach at McPherson College in McPherson, Kansas, serving for one season, in 1979, and compiling a record of 3–6.

Head coaching record

References

Year of birth missing (living people)
Living people
McPherson Bulldogs football coaches